Mignon Schwenke (born 4 November 1954) is a German politician for The Left.

Life and politics
Schwenke was born on 4 November 1954 in the West German town of Amberg and is a member of The Left since her foundation in 2007.

Since 2011 Schwenke is a member of the Landtag of Mecklenburg-Vorpommern and since 2016 vice-president of the same federal diet.

References

1954 births
Members of the Landtag of Mecklenburg-Western Pomerania
German politicians
People from Amberg
Living people